John Gabriel Hearn (March 26, 1863 – January 28, 1927) was a businessman and political figure in Quebec. He represented Québec-Ouest in the Legislative Assembly of Quebec from 1900 to 1904 as a Liberal member.

He was born in Quebec City, Canada East, the son of John Hearn and Mary Doran, and was educated at the Quebec commercial academy. He studied at the Royal Military College in Kingston from 9 September 1880 until 1884, cadet number 106.

He also studied at the Royal Arsenal at Woolwich. Hearn became a real estate agent and also administered the property accumulated by his father. In 1890, he married Katherine M. Ryan. He served on the Quebec municipal council and was president of the finance committee from 1896 to 1898. He died in Quebec City at the age of 63.

References 
 
 
 La dixième législature de Québec: galerie des membres du Conseil législatif et des députés à l'Assemblée législative (1901) Roy, PG 

John Gabriel Hearn
Captain Ernest F. Wurtele, R. L. "Royal Military College Club of Canada reference book [microform] : containing information respecting the graduates, ex-cadets and gentlemen cadets, of the Royal Military College of Canada" Royal Military College Club 1892

1863 births
1927 deaths
Politicians from Quebec City
Quebec Liberal Party MNAs
Royal Military College of Canada alumni
Anglophone Quebec people
Canadian people of Irish descent